The 1983 U.S. Pro Indoor was a men's tennis tournament played on indoor carpet courts that was part of the 1983 Volvo Grand Prix. It was played at the Spectrum in Philadelphia, Pennsylvania in the United States from January 31 through February 7, 1983. First-seeded John McEnroe won his second consecutive singles title at the event.

Finals

Singles

 John McEnroe defeated  Ivan Lendl 4–6, 7–6(9–7), 6–4, 6–3
 It was McEnroe's first singles title of the year and the 40th of his career.

Doubles

 Kevin Curren /  Steve Denton defeated  Peter Fleming /  John McEnroe 6–4, 7–6(7–2)
 It was Curren's first title of the year and the 14th of his career. It was Denton's first title of the year and the 15th of his career.

See also
 Lendl–McEnroe rivalry

References

External links
 ITF tournament edition details

U.S. Pro Indoor
U.S. Pro Indoor
U.S. Professional Indoor
U.S. Professional Indoor
U.S. Professional Indoor
U.S. Professional Indoor